Connie Walker may refer to:
 Connie Walker (astronomer) (born 1957), American astronomer
 29292 Conniewalker, a main belt asteroid, discovered in 1993
 Connie Walker (journalist) (born 1979), Canadian journalist

Walker, Connie